Peng Jinhui (born December 1964) is a Chinese engineer, administrator and politician currently serving as head of Organization Department of the CPC Chongqing Committee. Previously he served as head of Organization Department of the CPC Hainan Committee. He was president of Yunnan Minzu University between 2013 and 2016 and president of Kunming University of Science and Technology between 2016 and 2018. He is of Yi ethnicity. He is an alternate member of the 19th Central Committee of the Chinese Communist Party.

Biography
Peng was born in Jingdong Yi Autonomous County, Yunnan, in December 1964. He received his M.S. and a PhD degree in metallurgy from Kunming University of Science and Technology. After graduating, he taught at the university. He joined the Communist Party of China in July 1989. He carried out postdoctoral research at Karlsruhe Institute of Technology from 1994 to 1996 and Brunel University London from 1999 to 2000. His career transitioned from research to administration when he was appointed as vice-president of Kunming University of Science and Technology in January 2014. In September 2013 he was promoted again to become president of Yunnan Minzu University. In February 2016, he was transferred back to Kunming University of Science and Technology and appointed the president.

He began his political career in 2018, when he was appointed vice-governor of Hainan in January. He concurrently served as party chief of Yangpu Economic Development Zone. In October 2018 he succeeded  as head of Organization Department of the CPC Hainan Committee. On December 9, 2020, he was transferred to Chongqing and appointed head of Organization Department of the CPC Chongqing Committee, replacing Hu Wenrong.

Honours and awards
 November 2017 Member of the Chinese Academy of Engineering (CAE)

References

1964 births
Living people
People from Jingdong Yi Autonomous County
Kunming University of Science and Technology alumni
Karlsruhe Institute of Technology alumni
Alumni of Brunel University London
Scientists from Yunnan
Presidents of Kunming University of Science and Technology
Presidents of Yunnan Minzu University
Members of the Chinese Academy of Engineering
People's Republic of China politicians from Yunnan
Chinese Communist Party politicians from Yunnan
Yi people